Romanian Americans are Americans who have Romanian ancestry. According to the 2017 American Community Survey, 478,278 Americans indicated Romanian as their first or second ancestry, however other sources provide higher estimates, which are most likely more accurate, for the numbers of Romanian Americans in the contemporary US; for example, the Romanian-American Network supplies a rough estimate of 1.2 million who are fully or partially of Romanian ethnicity. There is also a significant number of people of Romanian Jewish ancestry, estimated at about 225,000.

History
The first Romanian known to have been to what is now the United States was Samuel Damian (also spelled Domien), a former priest. Samuel Damian's name appears as far back as 1748, when he placed an advertisement in the South Carolina Gazette announcing the electrical demonstrations he planned to give and inviting the public to attend. Letters written in 1753 and 1755 by Benjamin Franklin attest to the fact that the two had met and had carried on discussions concerning electricity. Damian remained in the States some years living in South Carolina, then travelled on to Jamaica.

There were several Romanians who became officers in the Union Army during the American Civil War, including Brevet Brigadier General George Pomutz, commander of the 15th Iowa Infantry Regiment, Captain Nicolae Dunca, who fought and died in the Battle of Cross Keys, and Captain Eugen Ghica-Comănești, of the 5th New York Volunteer Infantry. There were also several Romanian soldiers who fought in the Spanish–American War in 1898.

The first major wave of Romanian immigrants to the United States took place between 1895 and 1920, in which 145,000 Romanians entered the country. They came from various regions such as: Moldavia, Bukovina, Transylvania and neighboring countries such as Ukraine and Serbia with significant Romanian population.  The majority of these immigrants particularly those from Transylvania and Banat that were under Austro-Hungarian rule left their native regions because of economic depression and forced assimilation, a policy practiced by Hungarian rulers.

They settled mostly in the industrial centers in Pennsylvania and Delaware as well as in areas around the Great Lakes such as Cleveland, Chicago, and Detroit. The migrants from the Romanian Old Kingdom were mostly Jews, most of whom settled in New York. One of their prominent organizations was the United Rumanian Jews of America. 75,000 Romanian Jews emigrated in the period 1881–1914, mostly to the United States.

During the interwar period, the number of ethnic Romanians who migrated to the US decreased as a consequence of the economic development in Romania, but the number of Jews who migrated to the US increased, mostly after the rise of the fascism.

After the Second World War, the number of Romanians who migrated to the United States increased again. This time, they settled mostly in California, Florida and New York and they came from throughout Romania. After the Fall of Communism in 1989, increased numbers of Romanians came to the US, taking advantage of the new relaxation of Romania's emigration policies (during the communist rule, the borders were officially closed, although some people managed to migrate, including to the US). In the 1990s,  New York and Los Angeles were favorite destinations for Romanian emigrants to the US.

Distribution
Romanian Americans are distributed throughout the U.S., with concentrations found in the Midwest, such as in the states of Michigan, Ohio, and Illinois; the Northeast, in New York, Pennsylvania and Delaware, as well as California (Los Angeles and Sacramento). In the Southeast, communities are found in Georgia (Metro Atlanta), Florida (South Florida) and Alabama (Montgomery). There are also significant communities in the Southwest US, such as in Arizona. The largest Romanian American community is in the state of New York.

The states with the largest estimated Romanian American populations are:

New York (161,900)
California (128,133)
Florida (121,015)
Michigan (119,624)
Pennsylvania (114,529)
Illinois (106,017)
Ohio (83,228)
Georgia (47,689)

Romanian-born population
Romanian-born population in the US since 2010:

Romania-U.S relations 

The United States established diplomatic relations with Romania in 1880, following Romania's independence. The two countries severed diplomatic ties after Romania declared war on the United States in 1941; and re-established them in 1947. Relations remained strained during the Cold War era while Romania was under communist leadership. Cold and strained during the early post-war period, U.S. bilateral relations with Romania began to improve in the early 1960s with the signing of an agreement providing for partial settlement of American property claims. Cultural, scientific, and educational exchanges were initiated, and in 1964 the legations of both nations were promoted to full embassies. In March 2005, President Traian Băsescu made his first official visit to Washington to meet with President Bush, Secretary of State Condoleezza Rice, Secretary of Defense Donald Rumsfeld, and other senior U.S. officials. In December 2005, Secretary Rice visited Bucharest to meet with President Băsescu and to sign a bilateral defense cooperation agreement that would allow for the joint use of Romanian military facilities by U.S. troops. The first proof of principle exercise took place at Mihail Kogălniceanu Air Base from August to October 2007.

Romanian American culture
Romanian culture has merged with American culture, characterized by Romanian-born Americans adopting American culture or American-born people having strong Romanian heritage.

The Romanian culture can be seen in many different kinds, like Romanian music, newspapers, churches, cultural organizations and groups, such as the Romanian-American Congress or the Round Table Society NFP. Religion, predominantly within the Romanian Orthodox Church and the Romanian Greek Catholic Church, is an important trace of the Romanian presence in the United States, with churches in almost all bigger cities throughout the country.

In certain areas of the US, Romanian communities were first established several generations ago (in the late 19th century and early 20th century) such as in the Great Lakes region;  while in others, such as California and Florida, Romanian communities are formed especially by Romanians who emigrated more recently, into the late 20th century and early 21st century. After 1989, large numbers of Romanians emigrated to New York and Los Angeles.

One of the best known foods of Romanian origin is Pastrama.

Romanian-American Chamber Commerce
The Romanian-American Chamber of Commerce is a bilateral trade and investment organization that promotes commerce and investment between Romania and United States, and is headquartered in Washington D.C. The Chamber is composed of both Romanian and American businesses and has active chapters in New York, Washington, D.C., Florida, California and the Mid-West. It was founded in February 1990 and is celebrating its 20th year of activity in 2010. The RACC conducts a broad range of events, activities, and services and is a member organization of the Bi-National European Chambers of Commerce of the United States, which includes most of the bilateral chambers of the major EU member states.

Gallery

Notable people

See also
European Americans 
Romanian Canadians
Romania–United States relations  
Romanian-American organizations 
Romanian-American Chamber of Commerce 
Romanian Orthodox Metropolis of the Americas
The Romanian Orthodox Episcopate of America
Meridianul Românesc

References

Further reading
 Hațegan, Vasile. Romanian Culture in America. Cleveland, Ohio: Cleveland Cultural Center, 1985.
 Raica, Eugene S. and Alexandru T. Nemoianu. History of the "United Romanian Society". Southfield, Michigan: The Society, 1995.
 Rus, Flaviu Vasile. The cultural and diplomatic relations between Romania and the United States of America. 1880-1920, Cluj-Napoca, Editura Mega, 2018.
 Wertsman, Vladimir. The Romanians in America, 1748–1974: A Chronology and Factbook. Dobbs Ferry, New York: Oceana Publications, 1975. 
 Wertsman, Vladimir. The Romanians in America and Canada: A Guide to Information Sources (Gale Research Company, 1980).
 Alexandru T. Nemoianu. Tărâmuri: între Banat și America. Cluj-Napoca: Editura Limes, 2003. 
 Sasu, Aurel. Comunitățile românești din Statele Unite și Canada. Cluj-Napoca: Editura Limes, 2003.

External links
Romanian-American Network Inc.
Romanian Tribune Newspaper – published in Chicago for the Americans of Romanian heritage
Article about the Romanians in Cleveland
Heritage Organization of Romanian Americans In Minnesota

 
European-American society
 
United States